Roman Laspalles (born 2 November 1996) is a French professional footballer who plays as a defender for Championnat National 2 club Louhans-Cuiseaux.

Career
Laspalles joined Auxerre in 2016 from Guingamp. He made his debut at the professional level in the Ligue 2 game against Red Star on 30 July 2016. After making just one further league appearance, Lapalles signed for Les Herbiers in September 2017.

In November 2018, Laspalles joined Monts d'Or Azergues. After two seasons with the club, he signed for Romorantin in August 2020. In May 2021 he signed for Louhans-Cuiseaux.

Personal life
Roman's father, Nicolas Laspalles, was a former professional footballer who won the Ligue 1 with Nantes in 2001.

Honours 
Les Herbiers

 Coupe de France runner-up: 2017–18

References

External links
 

 

Living people
1996 births
Association football defenders
French footballers
People from Guingamp
Footballers from Brittany
Championnat National 3 players
Ligue 2 players
Championnat National players
Championnat National 2 players
En Avant Guingamp players
AJ Auxerre players
Les Herbiers VF players
GOAL FC players
SO Romorantin players
Louhans-Cuiseaux FC
Sportspeople from Côtes-d'Armor